The following article is a summary of the 2018–19 football season in France, which was the 85th season of competitive football in the country and ran from July 2018 to June 2019.

National teams

France national football team

Friendly matches

UEFA Nations League A

Group 1

UEFA Euro 2020 qualifying

Group H

France women's national football team

Friendly matches

2019 FIFA Women's World Cup

Group A

Knockout stage

League tables

Ligue 1

Ligue 2

Championnat National

Championnat National 2

Cup competitions

2018–19 Coupe de France

Final

2018–19 Coupe de la Ligue

Final

2018 Trophée des Champions

UEFA competitions

UEFA Champions League

Group stage

Group A

Group C

Group F

Round of 16

|}

UEFA Europa League

Qualifying phase and play-off round

Second qualifying round

|}

Third qualifying round

|}

Play-off round

|}

Group stage

Group C

Group H

Group K

Knockout phase

Round of 32

|}

Round of 16

|}

UEFA Youth League

UEFA Champions League Path

Group A

Group C

Group F

Domestic Champions Path

First round

|}

Second round

|}

Play-offs

|}

Knockout phase

Round of 16

|}

Quarter-finals

|}

UEFA Women's Champions League

Knockout phase

Round of 32

|}

Round of 16

|}

Quarter-finals

|}

Semi-finals

|}

Final

The final was played on 18 May 2019 at the Groupama Arena in Budapest. The "home" team for the final (for administrative purposes) was determined by an additional draw held after the quarter-final and semi-final draws.

References

 
Seasons in French football
France
France